Hadi Rani was a Queen from Rajasthan. She was a daughter of Hada Chauhan Rajput married to Ratan Singh, a Chundawat chieftain of Salumbar in Mewar who sacrificed herself to motivate her husband to go to a battle.

According to the legend, when Raj Singh I (1653–1680) of Mewar called Ratan Singh to join the rebellion against Mughal governor of Ajmer Subah, the commander, having married only a few days earlier.  He asked his wife, Hadi Rani, for some memento to take with him to the battlefield. Thinking that she was an obstacle to his doing his duty for Mewar, she cut off her head and put it on a plate. A servant covered it with a cloth and presented it to her husband. Devastated but nevertheless proud, the commander tied the memento around his neck by its hair and after their rebellion ended, he got to his knees and cut his neck, having lost the desire to live.

Legacy
Still today, people worship her in Rajasthan and folklore singers tell her story in songs about her chivalry, valor, courage. She is also inspiration of various stories, poems and songs in Rajasthan and her story is part of curriculum in Rajasthan. Hadi Rani Ki Baori is a stepwell located in Todaraisingh town in Tonk district of Rajasthan state in India. It is believed that it was built in 17th century CE. Rajasthan Police has formed a women's battalion named 'Hadi Rani Mahila Battalion' A Bollywood director announced a movie to make on her however that project was shut down after Padmavat as it was banned in various parts of India.

References

Year of birth missing
Year of death missing
Deaths by decapitation
Mewar
People from Rajasthan
Indian queen consorts
History of Udaipur
17th-century Indian women
17th-century Indian people
Indian folklore